The Australian Tennis Hall of Fame was established in 1993 by Tennis Australia under the leadership of then-president Geoff Pollard. Described by Tennis Australia as "one of the highest honours Australian tennis players can receive", inductees are recognised by the production of a bronze bust by local sculptor Barbara McLean, that is later displayed in Garden Square at Melbourne Park.  

The two inaugural inductees were Rod Laver and Margaret Court, recognised in a 1993 ceremony. Since then, a total of 39 individuals have been inducted into the Australian Tennis Hall of Fame, 10 of whom are women.  One wheelchair player and one administrator are amongst the group. Eight of the inductions have been made posthumously.  Thirty-one of the inductees are also members of the International Tennis Hall of Fame.

Inductions are generally made annually, on Australia Day, 26 January, although nobody was added to the hall of fame in 1999 or 2005.  On a number of occasions more than one induction has been made, but since 2011 a single induction has been made every year.  Inductions take place at the Rod Laver Arena; they are celebrated at a Hall of Fame Ball, which takes place each year on the eve of the Australian Open men's singles final.

Inductees

See also
 International Tennis Hall of Fame

References

External links
Australian Tennis Hall of Fame official website

Tennis in Australia
1993 establishments in Australia
Halls of fame in Australia